Aminul Haque Laskar (born 8 May 1966) is a Bharatiya Janata Party politician from Assam. He has been elected as an MLA in Assam Legislative Assembly election in 2016 from Sonai constituency. He was the only Muslim to be elected to the state's legislative assembly on a BJP ticket.

Aminul was also elected as the Deputy Speaker of Assam Legislative Assembly on 31 July 2019.

References

External links 
 Page at assamassembly.gov.in

Living people
Bharatiya Janata Party politicians from Assam
Assam MLAs 2016–2021
1966 births
Bengali politicians
Indian Muslims
Deputy Speakers of the Assam Legislative Assembly